No Easy Way Out may refer to:
 "No Easy Way Out" (Robert Tepper song), from the 1985 motion picture soundtrack album Rocky IV
 "No Easy Way Out", a song by Ozzy Osbourne from Down to Earth
 Lucian Bute vs. Carl Froch, a championship boxing fight
 No Easy Way Out (album)

See also 
 Easy Way Out (disambiguation)